Ricky Kayame (born 21 September 1994) is an Indonesian professional footballer who plays as a forward for Liga 2 club Persewar Waropen.

Club career

Persipura Jayapura
In October 2012, he signed a contract with Persipura Jayapura after being selected in a selection performed by the club to scout local talents. He made his debut on 3 July 2013 against Persidafon Dafonsoro and managed to score two goals in an 8-1 win. On 22 May 2014, he scored his third goal in a 2-0 win against Persiba Bantul.

Honours

Club
Persipura Jayapura
 Indonesia Super League: 2013
 Indonesia Soccer Championship A: 2016

Persebaya Surabaya
 Liga 2: 2017

Arema
 Indonesia President's Cup: 2019

Individual
 Indonesia President's Cup Top Goalscorer: 2019 (shared)

References

External links
 
 Ricky Kayame at Liga Indonesia

1993 births
Living people
Indonesian footballers
Papuan sportspeople
Liga 1 (Indonesia) players
Persipura Jayapura players
Persib Bandung players
Persebaya Surabaya players
Arema F.C. players
Persita Tangerang players
People from Nabire Regency
Association football forwards
Sportspeople from Papua